Mosaic is an online magazine of Jewish ideas, religion, politics, and culture which was established in June 2013.

An online subscription magazine, it offers full-length monthly essays "on an issue or theme of pressing significance for Jews, Judaism, or the Jewish state". Topics range from cultural or religious questions to social and philosophical issues, with in-depth responses to each essay appended throughout the month. In addition, Mosaic publishes a variety of briefer pieces offering comments on the news of the day, historical reflections, and more. Finally, a permanent fixture of Mosaic is its editors’ picks: a daily selection of the most urgent items, gathered from far-flung places around the web, and introduced in short summaries detailing their particular substance and import. 

Authors who have published in Mosaic include: Leon Kass, Natan Sharansky, Meir Soloveichik, Ruth Wisse, Martin Kramer, Michael Doran, David Wolpe, Hillel Halkin, Matti Friedman, Elliott Abrams, Einat Wilf, John Bolton, Douglas Feith, Dore Gold, Daniel Gordis, and many more. In addition, Mosaic carries the popular etymology column Philologos.

The editor is Jonathan Silver. Mosaic's founding editor, and now editor-at-large, is Neal Kozodoy.

References

External links
 

Cultural magazines published in the United States
Online magazines published in the United States
Jewish culture
Jewish magazines published in the United States
Jewish websites
Magazines established in 2013
Secular Jewish culture in the United States